Carlyle Lake State Fish and Wildlife Area is an Illinois state park on  in Fayette County, Illinois, United States.

References

Something for Everyone - Carlyle Lake

State parks of Illinois
Protected areas of Fayette County, Illinois
Protected areas established in 1966
1966 establishments in Illinois